Kona Guitars and Kona music accessories is a full line of acoustic and electric guitars and amplifiers. M&M Merchandisers, Inc. in Fort Worth, Texas established the music line in 2000 to make high quality but affordable guitars.

Products

K1 Series
The K1 Series was the first acoustic guitar developed for the Kona line. The dreadnought cutaway design features a laminated spruce top, Sapele back and sides, rosewood fret board and a 4.625-inch body depth for a unique bold sound. Since 2000, more colors and styles have been added to make the K1 Series one of the most successful guitars sold.

K2 Series
The K2 Series was the first thin body acoustic/electric guitar developed for the Kona line. The guitar features a high-gloss finished laminated spruce top, gold die-cast tuners, rosewood fretboard, full body and neck binding, an active pick-up system and a three-inch body depth. Since 2000, more colors and a left-handed model have been added to the K2 Series of guitars.

As of 2013, Kona offers more than 30 different acoustic, electric, acoustic/electric and bass guitars; mandolins; ukuleles; violins; amplifiers; and microphones.

Products
In 2006, Wiley Publishing and M&M Merchandisers, Inc. partnered to create a line of musical starter packs as part of the For Dummies line of instructional packages. Kona guitars are included in the Acoustic, Electric and Electric Bass Guitar Starter Packs For Dummies.

References

External links

 Official website 

K
K
Audio equipment manufacturers of the United States